Joe Kaminer (25 January 1934 – 3 August 2021) was a South African rugby union player.

Kaminer, who is Jewish, was born in Warmbad and schooled in Pietersburg. He played a single test for the Boks, making his debut on 16 Aug 1958, with the Boks losing against France at Ellis Park. Kaminer played for Wits and Transvaal.

Test history

See also
List of select Jewish rugby union players

References

External links
 Joe Kaminer on scrum.com
 The Glory of the Game about the Ten Jewish Springboks.

1934 births
2021 deaths
People from Bela-Bela Local Municipality
South African Jews
South Africa international rugby union players
South African rugby union players
Jewish rugby union players
Rugby union players from Limpopo
Rugby union centres
Golden Lions players